Blandy may refer to:

Places
 Blandy, Essonne, in the Essonne department
 Blandy, Seine-et-Marne, in the Seine-et-Marne department
 Blandy, Highland, a location in the highlands of Scotland, U.K.

People
 David Blandy (born 1976), British artist
 Mary Blandy (1720–1752), English murderer
 Stella Blandy (1836-1925), French woman of letters, feminist
 William H. P. Blandy (1890–1954), American admiral